Madean may refer to:

Madean Peak, a mountain in Alaska
Madean District, a district in Peru